About Cherry is a 2012 drama film and the directorial debut of Stephen Elliott. It is based on a script written by Elliott and porn industry veteran Lorelei Lee. It stars Ashley Hinshaw, James Franco, Heather Graham, and Dev Patel. The project was filmed in San Francisco and premièred at the 2012 Berlin International Film Festival.

Plot
Angelina (Hinshaw) is an 18-year-old girl not far from graduating from high school. Her boyfriend Bobby (Weston) suggests that she should take naked pictures of herself and sell them. She is initially hesitant, but eventually does the photo shoot and uses the money to run away to San Francisco with her best friend Andrew (Patel). At a strip club party in the city, Angelina meets a wealthy lawyer named Francis (Franco), who offers to introduce her to a glamorous world of expensive dresses and lavish parties. Angelina also meets Margaret (Graham), a former porn star turned adult film director. Margaret offers Angelina, now using the porn name Cherry, direction in her entry into the San Francisco porn industry. Angelina makes several soft pornography films before deciding to do a hardcore film. After Angelina shoots the film, an angry Francis chastises her before getting them in a car accident.  Angelina returns home to find Andrew watching one of her films. After an argument, she decides to leave and meets Margaret at a bar. They make out before returning to Margaret's apartment to have sex. The final scene is of Angelina some time afterwards, having moved in with Margaret and becoming her lover, and takes on a new job as a porn director.

Cast
Ashley Hinshaw as Angelina / Cherry
James Franco as Francis
Dev Patel as Andrew
Heather Graham as Margaret
Lili Taylor as Phyllis
Diane Farr as Jillian
Megan Boone as Jake
Vincent Palo as Paco
Jonny Weston as Bobby
Ernest Waddell as Vaughn
Sensi Pearl as Vikki
Maya Raines as Jojo
Veronica Valencia as Amber

Reception
The film holds 14% on Rotten Tomatoes.

See also
Kink

References

External links
  
 
 
 

2012 films
2010s English-language films
2012 drama films
2012 independent films
2012 LGBT-related films
American drama films
American independent films
Bisexuality-related films
Female bisexuality in film
Films about pornography
Films scored by Jeff Russo
Films shot in San Francisco
IFC Films films
2010s American films